Tonteri is a Finnish surname. Notable people with the surname include:

Pekka Tonteri (1880–1953), Finnish politician
Roope Tonteri (born 1992), Finnish snowboarder
Kristina Tonteri-Young (born 1998), Finnish actress and balletdancer

Finnish-language surnames